Carpineto Romano is a comune (municipality) in the Metropolitan City of Rome in the Italian region Lazio, located about  southeast of Rome.

It is the birthplace of Pope Leo XIII. 

Carpineto Romano borders the following municipalities: Bassiano, Gorga, Maenza, Montelanico, Norma, Roccagorga, Sezze, Supino.

Twin towns - sister cities

Carpineto Romano is twinned

 Wadowice, Poland

References
Notes

External links
 Official website

Cities and towns in Lazio
Pope Leo XIII